Yelken Yacht Club is a yacht club in Awaza, Turkmenistan. The first yacht club in Turkmenistan.

History 
Built by Turkish company Polimeks. Construction began in 2009.

It was opened with the participation of President of Turkmenistan Gurbanguly Berdimuhamedov to June 2013.

In 2014, the yacht club held the PWA World Cup.

References

External links
 

Yacht clubs in Turkmenistan
2013 establishments in Turkmenistan
Sports venues in Turkmenistan